A lime (from French lime, from Arabic līma, from Persian līmū, "lemon") is a citrus fruit, which is typically round, green in color,  in diameter, and contains acidic juice vesicles.

There are several species of citrus trees whose fruits are called limes, including the Key lime (Citrus aurantiifolia), Persian lime, Makrut lime, and desert lime. Limes are a rich source of vitamin C, are sour, and are often used to accent the flavours of foods and beverages. They are grown year-round. Plants with fruit called "limes" have diverse genetic origins; limes do not form a monophyletic group.

Plants known as "lime"
The difficulty in identifying exactly which species of fruit are called lime in different parts of the English-speaking world (and the same problem applies to synonyms in other European languages) is increased by the botanical complexity of the citrus genus itself, to which the majority of limes belong. Species of this genus hybridise readily, and it is only recently that genetic studies have started to shed light on the structure of the genus. The majority of cultivated species are in reality hybrids, produced from the citron (Citrus medica), the mandarin orange (Citrus reticulata), the pomelo (Citrus maxima) and in particular with many lime varieties, the micrantha (Citrus hystrix var. micrantha).
 Australian limes (former Microcitrus and Eremocitrus)
 Australian desert lime (Citrus glauca)
 Australian finger lime (Citrus australasica)
 Australian lime (Citrus australis)
 Blood lime (red finger lime × (sweet orange × mandarin))
 Makrut lime (Citrus hystrix); a papeda relative, is one of the three most widely produced limes globally.
 Key lime (Citrus × aurantiifolia=Citrus micrantha × Citrus medica) is also one of the three most widely produced limes globally.
 Philippine lime (Citrus × microcarpa), a kumquat × mandarin hybrid
 Persian lime (Citrus × latifolia) a key lime × lemon hybrid, is the single most widely produced lime globally, with Mexico being the largest producer.
 Rangpur lime (Mandarin lime, lemandarin, Citrus limonia), a mandarin orange × citron hybrid
 Spanish lime (Melicoccus bijugatus); not a citrus
 Sweet lime etc. (Citrus limetta, etc.); several distinct citrus hybrids
 Wild lime (Adelia ricinella); not a citrus
 Wild lime (Zanthoxylum fagara); not a citrus
 Limequat (lime × kumquat)

Note that the tree species known in Britain as lime trees (Tilia sp.), called linden or basswood in other dialects of English, are broadleaf temperate plants unrelated to the citrus fruits.

History

Most species and hybrids of citrus plants called "limes" have varying origins within tropical Southeast Asia and South Asia. They were spread throughout the world via migration and trade. The makrut lime, in particular, was one of the earliest citrus fruits introduced to other parts of the world by humans. They were spread into Micronesia and Polynesia via the Austronesian expansion (c. 3000–1500 BCE). They were also later spread into Middle East, and the Mediterranean region via the spice trade and the incense trade routes from as early as ~1200 BCE.

To prevent scurvy during the 19th century, British sailors were issued a daily allowance of citrus, such as lemon, and later switched to lime. The use of citrus was initially a closely guarded military secret, as scurvy was a common scourge of various national navies, and the ability to remain at sea for lengthy periods without contracting the disorder was a huge benefit for the military.  British sailors thus acquired the nickname "Limey" because of their use of limes.

Production
In 2021, world production of limes (combined with lemons for reporting) was 20.8 million tonnes, led by India, Mexico, and China as the major producers (table).

Uses

Limes have higher contents of sugars and acids than lemons do. Lime juice may be squeezed from fresh limes, or purchased in bottles in both unsweetened and sweetened varieties. Lime juice is used to make limeade, and as an ingredient (typically as sour mix) in many cocktails.

Lime pickles are an integral part of Indian cuisine, especially in South India. In Kerala, the Onam Sadhya usually includes either lemon pickle or lime pickle. Other Indian preparations of limes include sweetened lime pickle, salted pickle, and lime chutney.

In cooking, lime is valued both for the acidity of its juice and the floral aroma of its zest. It is a common ingredient in authentic Mexican, Vietnamese and Thai dishes. Lime soup is a traditional dish from the Mexican state of Yucatan. It is also used for its pickling properties in ceviche. Some guacamole recipes call for lime juice.

The use of dried limes (called black lime or limoo) as a flavouring is typical of Persian cuisine, Iraqi cuisine, as well as in Eastern Arabian cuisine baharat (a spice mixture that is also called kabsa or kebsa).

Key lime gives the character flavoring to the American dessert known as Key lime pie. In Australia, desert lime is used for making marmalade.

Lime is an ingredient in several highball cocktails, often based on gin, such as gin and tonic, the gimlet and the Rickey. Freshly squeezed lime juice is also considered a key ingredient in margaritas, although sometimes lemon juice is substituted. It is also found in many rum cocktails such as the Daiquiri, and other tropical drinks. 

Lime extracts and lime essential oils are frequently used in perfumes, cleaning products, and aromatherapy.

Nutrition and phytochemicals

Raw limes are 88% water, 10% carbohydrates and less than 1% each of fat and protein (table). Only vitamin C content at 35% of the Daily Value (DV) per 100 g serving is significant for nutrition, with other nutrients present in low DV amounts (table).  Lime juice contains slightly less citric acid than lemon juice (about 47 g/L), nearly twice the citric acid of grapefruit juice, and about five times the amount of citric acid found in orange juice.

Lime pulp and peel contain diverse phytochemicals, including polyphenols and terpenes.

Toxicity

Contact with lime peel or lime juice followed by exposure to ultraviolet light may lead to phytophotodermatitis, which is sometimes called margarita photodermatitis or lime disease (not to be confused with Lyme disease). Bartenders handling limes and other citrus fruits while preparing cocktails may develop phytophotodermatitis.

A class of organic chemical compounds called furanocoumarins are reported to cause phytophotodermatitis in humans. Limes contain numerous furanocoumarin compounds, including limettin (also called citropten), bergapten, isopimpinellin, xanthotoxin (also called methoxsalen), and psoralen. Bergapten appears to be the primary furanocoumarin compound responsible for lime-induced phytophotodermatitis.

Lime peel contains higher concentrations of furanocoumarins than lime pulp (by one or two orders of magnitude), and so lime peels are considerably more phototoxic than lime pulp.

See also
 Limeade
 Lime production in Mexico
 List of citrus fruits
 List of culinary fruits varieties

References

External links
 
 

Citrus
Citrus hybrids
Cocktail garnishes
Crops
Sour fruits